Martin Vetterli (born 4 October 1957) is the current president of École Polytechnique Fédérale de Lausanne (EPFL) in Switzerland, succeeding Patrick Aebischer. He's a professor of engineering and was formerly the president of the National Research Council of the Swiss National Science Foundation.

Martin Vetterli has made numerous research contributions in the general area of digital signal processing and is best known for his work on wavelets. He has also contributed to other areas, including sampling (signal processing), computational complexity theory, signal processing for communications, digital video processing and joint source/channel coding. His work has led to over 150 journal publications and to two dozen of patents.

Career 

Martin Vetterli received the Dipl. El.-Ing. degree from the ETH Zurich in 1981, the Master of Science degree from Stanford University in 1982, and the Doctorat ès Sciences degree from École polytechnique fédérale de Lausanne (EPFL) in 1986.

After his dissertation, he was an assistant and associate professor in electrical engineering at Columbia University in New York, and in 1993, he became an associate and then full professor at the Department of Electrical Engineering and Computer Sciences at the University of California at Berkeley.

In 1995, he joined the EPFL as a full professor. He held several positions at the EPFL, including chair of communication systems and founding director of the National Competence Center in Research on Mobile Information and Communication systems (NCCR-MICS).

From 2004 to 2011, he was vice president of the EPFL for international affairs and, from 2011 to 2012, he was the dean of the School of Computer and Communications Sciences at the EPFL.

In 2015, he was elected to the United States National Academy of Engineering for his contributions to the development of time-frequency representations and algorithms in multimedia signal processing and communications.

From 2013 to 2016 he was the president of the National Research Council of the Swiss National Science Foundation, before being elected as the president of École Polytechnique Fédérale de Lausanne (EPFL) in Switzerland.

He is also responsible for developing, publishing and maintaining an extensive massive open online course on the basics of digital signal processing. The course is a collaboration effort between him and his colleague, Paolo Prandoni. The course was first offered in February 2013 on Coursera and has been offered every year on the site since then. Each session runs for 10 weeks.

Scientific contributions 

Martin Vetterli works in the areas of electrical engineering, computer sciences and applied mathematics. His work covers wavelets and applications, image and video compression (data compression), self-organized communications systems and sensor networks, as well as fast algorithms.

At the core of the laboratory's current research is mathematical signal processing, that is, the set of tools and algorithms from applied harmonic analysis that are central to signal processing. These include representations for signals (Fourier, wavelets, frames), sampling theory, and sparse representations.

A main application of signal processing is in communications and sensor networks. In addition to important classic topics like channel estimation and equalization, multiuser systems like sensor networks are of great interest. This leads to distributed compression, sampling, and modeling of physical phenomena.

The area of audio processing and digital acoustics deals with multi-channel acquisition, processing and rendering of audio signals. This includes questions of sound field sampling, synthesis and perception.

Inverse problems and tomography are key signal processing tasks where state of the art techniques have high potential impact. In particular, the project on ultrasound tomography intends to solve a long-standing quest for a safe and affordable breast cancer screening method.

In the area of image/video processing and applications, his research has on-going projects in image acquisition, image representations, and super-resolution imaging. Applications include image annotation and augmented reality for mobile devices.
 
The eFacsimile research project, sponsored by Google, is focused on the research and development of a new acquisition, representation and rendering paradigm for the high-quality reproduction of artwork.

The research of Martin Vetterli has led to about 150 journal papers and resulted also in about two dozen patents that led to technology transfers to high-tech companies and the creation of several start-ups.

Martin Vetterli is a co-author of the book Wavelets and Subband Coding (Prentice-Hall, 1995). In 2008, Vetterli authored with Paolo Prandoni a free textbook Signal Processing for Communications.

In 2014, another book with the title Foundations of Signal Processing (coauthored by Jelena Kovačević and Vivek Goyal) was also published freely accessible.

Presidency of the EPFL 

On 1 January 2017, Martin Vetterli became the fifth president of the EPFL. The priorities of his direction team include open science, computational thinking, ethics and sustainability.

Awards and honours 
 2017 IEEE Jack S. Kilby Signal Processing Medal
 Best paper award from EURASIP Journal on Advances in Signal Processing (1984)
 Best paper award from IEEE Signal Processing Society (1991, 1996 and 2006)
 Fellow of the IEEE "for contributions to the theory and practice of subband coding and wavelets" (1995)
 National Latsis Prize (1996)
 SPIE Presidential award (1999)
 IEEE Signal Processing Technical Achievement Award (2001)
 Fellow of the Association for Computing Machinery (2009)
 Fellow of EURASIP
 IEEE Signal Processing Society Award (2010)
 Former member of the Swiss Science and Innovation Council (2000-2004)
 President of the National Research Council of the Swiss National Science Foundation
 Member of the US National Academy of Engineering.

References

External links 

Martin Vetterli's homepage at the EPFL
Wavelets and Subband Coding webpage
Foundations of Signal processing webpage

1957 births
Living people
Fellow Members of the IEEE
Fellows of the Association for Computing Machinery
Electrical engineering academics
Swiss electronics engineers
ETH Zurich alumni
Academic staff of the École Polytechnique Fédérale de Lausanne
École Polytechnique Fédérale de Lausanne alumni
Members of the United States National Academy of Engineering